The Premier of the Cabinet is the head of government of North Korea and a key adviser to the Supreme Leader of North Korea. The office is also alternatively known as Prime Minister of North Korea. The prime minister of North Korea is the head of government of North Korea, and appointment requires approval from the nation's parliament, the Supreme People's Assembly.

The current premier is Kim Tok-hun, who is also a member of the Presidium of the Politburo of the Workers' Party of Korea.

History
Originally, under the 1948 Constitution of the DPRK, the Premier was the highest state post in North Korea. Kim Il-sung himself inaugurated the post, keeping it for 24 years until 1972, while the ceremonial role of the head of State rested in the Chairman of the Standing Committee of the Supreme People's Assembly.

The 1972 Constitution created the post of President of the DPRK, which replaced the premiership as the top state post. The executive presidency was created with Kim in mind, and he transferred to that post soon after the Constitution was promulgated. The Premier was now the head of the Administration Council, but most of the powers of the former cabinet were passed to the ], the highest ruling council chaired by the president himself. The first premier after Kim Il-sung was his long-time ally Kim Il. The post was then officially known as Premier of the Administration Council (jungmuwon chongni).

After Kim Il-sung died, the post of president remained vacant (officially Kim Il-sung was proclaimed Eternal President) as his son Kim Jong-il planned a new State reorganization. A constitution revision in 1998 abolished both the Central People's Committee and the Administration Council, re-creating the Cabinet.

Functions
The Premier represents and oversees the cabinet, which is charged with executing the policies decided by the Central Committee of the Workers' Party of Korea. The office has no policy-making authority of its own.

The Premier is nominally part of a triumvirate overseeing North Korea's executive branch, alongside the Chairman of the Presidium of the Supreme People's Assembly and the President of the State Affairs Commission. According to the constitution of the DPRK, the SAC chairman, SPA Presidium president and Premier have powers equivalent to one-third of those of a president's powers in most presidential systems. The SPA presidium chairman conducts foreign relations, the premier handles domestic matters and heads the government, and the SAC chairman (known as the chairman of the National Defence Commission before 2016) commands the armed forces. However, the SAC chairman is constitutionally defined as "the highest post in the state" and the country's supreme leader.

The Premier ranks as the lowest member of the executive triumvirate: significantly, Kim Jong-il was NDC Chairman without interruption from 1993 until 2011, and Kim Yong-nam was President of the SPA Presidium from 1998 to 2019, while there have been six premiers since Kim Il-sung's death.

List of office holders
The following is a list of premiers of North Korea since its founding in 1948.

Timeline

See also

 Vice Premier of North Korea
 Prime Minister of Imperial Korea (1895–1910)
 Government of North Korea
 Supreme Leader (North Korean title)
 List of heads of state of North Korea
 President of the State Affairs Commission
 Eternal leaders of North Korea
 Politics of North Korea
 Prime Minister of South Korea

References

 
Cabinet of North Korea